Spring Point Airport  is an airport serving Spring Point on Acklins Island in The Bahamas. Bahamasair flies to Spring Point Airport, and it is the only airline that flies here.

Facilities

Airlines and destinations

References

External links
 
 

Airports in the Bahamas